Bérégadougou is a town in the Bérégadougou Department of Comoé Province in south-western Burkina Faso. It is the capital of Bérégadougou Department and the town has a population of 9,036.

See also
Beregadougou Classified Forest

References

External links
Satellite map at Maplandia.com

Populated places in the Cascades Region
Comoé Province